Society of Antiquaries can refer to:

Society of Antiquaries of London
Society of Antiquaries of Scotland
Society of Antiquaries of Newcastle upon Tyne
Royal Society of Antiquaries of Ireland